Arrietty, titled  in Japan and The Secret World of Arrietty in North America, is a 2010 Japanese animated fantasy film directed by Hiromasa Yonebayashi as his feature film debut as a director, animated by Studio Ghibli for the Nippon Television Network, Dentsu, Hakuhodo DY Media Partners, Walt Disney Japan, Mitsubishi, Toho and Wild Bunch. The screenplay by Hayao Miyazaki and Keiko Niwa, was based on the 1952 novel The Borrowers by Mary Norton, an English author of children's books, about a family of tiny people who live secretly in the walls and floors of a typical household, borrowing items from humans to survive. The film stars the voices of Mirai Shida, Ryunosuke Kamiki, Shinobu Otake, Keiko Takeshita, Tatsuya Fujiwara, Tomokazu Miura, and Kirin Kiki, and tells the story of a young Borrower (Shida) befriending a human boy (Kamiki), while trying to avoid being detected by the other humans.

Ghibli announced the film in late 2009 with Yonebayashi making his directorial debut. Miyazaki supervised the production as a developing planner. The voice actors were approached in April 2010, and Cécile Corbel wrote the film's score as well as its theme song. This film marks the cinematic debut of Hiromasa Yonebayashi, as well as the British dub marking the cinematic debut of Tom Holland.

The film was released in Japan on July 17, 2010, by Toho, and received positive reviews from critics, who praised its animation and music. It became the highest-grossing Japanese film at the Japanese box office for the year 2010, and grossed over $145 million worldwide. The film also won the Animation of the Year award at the 34th Japan Academy Prize award ceremony. Two English-language versions of the film were produced, a British dub released in the United Kingdom on July 29, 2011 by Optimum Releasing and an American dub released in North America on February 17, 2012 by Walt Disney Pictures.

Plot
A boy named Shō remembers the week in summer he spent at his mother's home with his maternal great aunt, Sadako, and the housemaid, Haru. When Shō arrives, he gets a glimpse of Arrietty, a Borrower girl, returning to her home through an underground air vent.

At night, Arrietty's father, Pod, takes her on her first "borrowing" mission, to get sugar and tissue paper. After obtaining a sugar cube from the kitchen, they travel to a bedroom which they enter through a dollhouse. It is Shō's bedroom; he sees Arrietty when she tries to take a tissue from his table. Startled, she drops the sugar cube. Shō tries to comfort her but Pod and Arrietty leave.

The next day, Shō puts the sugar cube and a little note beside the air vent. Pod warns her not to take it because their existence must be kept secret from humans. Nevertheless, she sneaks out to visit Shō in his bedroom. Without showing herself, she tells him  to leave her family alone but they soon have a conversation, which is interrupted by the crow. The crow attacks Arrietty but Shō saves her. On her return home, Arrietty is intercepted by her father. Realizing they have been detected, Pod and his wife Homily decide they must move out. Shō learns from Sadako that some of his ancestors had noticed the presence of Borrowers in the house and had the dollhouse built for them. The Borrowers had not been seen since.

Pod returns injured from a borrowing mission and is helped home by Spiller, a survivalist boy he met. Shō removes the floorboard concealing the Borrower household and replaces their kitchen with the kitchen from the dollhouse to show he hopes them to stay. However, the Borrowers are frightened by this and speed up their moving process. Pod recovers and Arrietty bids farewell to Shō. Shō apologises that he has forced them to move out and reveals he has had a heart condition since birth and will have an operation in a few days. The operation does not have a good chance of success. He is accepting, saying that every living thing dies.

Haru notices the floorboards have been disturbed. She unearths the Borrowers' house and captures Homily. Alerted by her mother's screams, Arrietty goes to investigate. Saddened by her departure, Shō returns to his room. Haru locks him in and calls a pest control company to capture the other Borrowers alive. Arrietty comes to Shō for help; they rescue Homily and he destroys all traces of the Borrowers’ presence.

On their way out during the night, the Borrowers are spotted by the cat Niya. Thereupon Niya leads Shō to the "river", a small rivulet, where the Borrowers are waiting for Spiller to take them further. Shō gives Arrietty a sugar cube and tells her that she will always be a part of him and that her courage and the Borrowers' fight for survival have made him want to live through the operation. In return, Arrietty gives him her hairclip, a small clothespin, as a token of remembrance. The Borrowers leave in a floating teapot with Spiller in search of a new home.

The Disney international dubbed version contains a final monologue, where Shō states that he never saw Arrietty again. He returned to the house a year later, indicating that the operation had been successful. Happily he overhears rumors of objects disappearing in neighboring homes.

Voice cast

Production

Development
On December 16, 2009, Studio Ghibli announced Karigurashi no Arrietty to be released in 2010. The film is based on the novel The Borrowers by the British writer Mary Norton. The novel won the Carnegie Medal for children's literature in 1953, and had already been adapted into two films and a TV series at the time. Studio Ghibli founders Isao Takahata and Hayao Miyazaki had been contemplating an adaptation of this novel for the past 40 years.

Animator Hiromasa Yonebayashi was announced as the film director on the same day. Hiromasa Yonebayashi was one of the animators for the Studio Ghibli films Howl's Moving Castle, Ponyo and Spirited Away. He was also the reserve director for the film Tales from Earthsea. Miyazaki was announced as the production planner.

Casting
The Japanese voice cast of the film was announced on April 13, 2010. Actress Mirai Shida was cast as the voice of Arrietty. Arrietty was Shida's first voice acting role. In addition, Ryunosuke Kamiki, who has voiced characters in other Studio Ghibli films, including Spirited Away, and Howl's Moving Castle was cast as Shō.

Besides them, the film's cast includes Tomokazu Miura, Shinobu Otake, Keiko Takeshita, and Kirin Kiki. The four actors had previous voice acting experience, but none of them had been in a Studio Ghibli film before. Miura and Otake were, respectively, cast as Arrietty's parents Pod and Homily. In addition, Takeshita voiced Shō's aunt and Kiki voiced the housemaid Haru.

On January 8, 2011, actress and singer Bridgit Mendler was cast as Arrietty for the film's North American release. Besides Mendler, the cast included Will Arnett, Amy Poehler, Carol Burnett, and David Henrie. The film had a different voice cast for the United Kingdom release. The cast included Saoirse Ronan, Tom Holland, Mark Strong, Olivia Colman, Phyllida Law, and Geraldine McEwan.

Music

The film score of Arrietty was composed by French recording artist and musician Cécile Corbel, the first time a non-Japanese composer worked with the studio.

After ending promotion for her second album SongBook vol. 2, Corbel, a fan of the studio's output, sent one of her remaining promo albums to Studio Ghibli. At the time, the film was in pre-production and producer Toshio Suzuki wanted a Celtic-inspired score. Less than ten days later, she received an email from Studio Ghibli about her CD. The envelope, because it was handwritten, had caught the eye of Suzuki, and he had listened to the album. He was captivated by Corbel's voice and the sound of the harp, and after playing the album for Yonebayashi and Yamaha Music, Corbel was assigned to write the title song of the film, followed by more songs. By 2009, she was asked to compose the entire score.

The score combined the musical styles of Celtic folk music, medieval Turkish songs, Baroque madrigals, and Irish marches. It was recorded in France with a small orchestra including acoustic guitar, bass, a string quartet, bagpipes, Irish flutes, bodhrán, percussion instruments, and accordion. The soundtrack album won "Best Original Soundtrack Album" at the 2011 Japan Gold Disc Awards. It also became a RIAJ-certified gold record in Japan, where more than 200,000 copies were sold.

Arrietty's Song

"Arrietty's Song", the film's main theme, was performed by Corbel in Japanese, English, German, Italian, Breton, and French.

The song made its public debut in a presentation of the song by singer Corbel and percussionist Marco in Apple's store in Shibuya, Tokyo, on 8 August 2010. Some of the Japanese theme songs for this film, including "Arrietty’s Song" was first released online through the iTunes Store, mora and Musico on 19 December 2009. Subsequently, the official album containing all of the theme songs of this film was released on 14 July 2010. The album's listing on the Oricon charts peaked at the 31st position. Separately, the song "Arrietty’s Song" were released as a singles album on 7 April 2010.

Track listings
 U.S. / Digital Download
 "Arrietty's Song" (Digital Download) – 3:26

Charts

Summertime

"Summertime" is a song performed by American pop recording artist Bridgit Mendler for the film's North American release. The song was released by Hollywood Records on February 2, 2012.
The song premiered on Radio Disney on February 1, with its release on iTunes on February 2, 2012. In an interview with Kidzworld about what the song is about, Mendler explained, "It’s not based on personal experience but I think the whole summertime, kind of cheerful, innocent thing was relatable for the movie and something they liked. The movie is about imagery and there are some good images in that song."

The music video premiered on Disney Channel on January 10. It was directed by Art Spigel, director of the Disney Channel Games, and was filmed on-location at Disney's Golden Oak Ranch in Los Angeles, California.

Track listings
 U.S. / Digital Download
 "Summertime" (Digital Download) – 3:01

Charts

Release history

Release
Arrietty was first released in Japanese cinemas on July 17, 2010, by Japanese film distributor Toho. The film was officially released at a ceremony attended by the film's cast and Yonebayashi. Corbel performed the film's theme song at the event. In addition, Yonebayashi hinted that he wanted the film to beat the record of over 12 million audiences set by previous Studio Ghibli film, Ponyo. The film was screened in 447 theaters throughout Japan during its debut weekend.

In the United Kingdom, the film was released on July 29, 2011 by Optimum Releasing. The film was released by Walt Disney Studios Motion Pictures under the Walt Disney Pictures banner in the United States on February 17, 2012, with the title The Secret World of Arrietty. The North American dub was directed by Gary Rydstrom, produced by Frank Marshall and Kathleen Kennedy and written by Karey Kirkpatrick.

A screening of the North American release was held on 21 January 2012 in New York City. The film opened in 1,522 screens during its general release.

Home media
Arrietty was released as part of the Studio Ghibli Collection by Disney Japan in both Blu-ray Disc and DVD formats within Japan. The DVD version of the film consists of two discs in the region 2 format. The Blu-ray version consists of a single disc in the Region A format. Both versions were released in Japan on 17 June 2011, and both contain English and Japanese subtitles.

StudioCanal (previously known as Optimum Releasing) released the movie on both Region 2 DVD and Region B Blu-ray format in the United Kingdom on 9 January 2012. A DVD/Blu-ray Double Play "Collector's Edition" was also released, featuring art cards.

The film was released by Walt Disney Studios Home Entertainment on DVD and as a Blu-ray and DVD combo pack on May 22, 2012 in North America. GKIDS re-issued the movie on Blu-ray and DVD on November 21, 2017 under a new deal with Studio Ghibli.

Reception

Box office
Arrietty earned $19,202,743 in North America and $126,368,084 in other territories for a worldwide total of $145,570,827. It is the fourth-highest grossing anime film in the United States, and the highest not based on a game franchise.

Arrietty debuted at the first position in the Japanese box office. More than one million people went to see the film during its opening weekend. It grossed around 1.35 billion yen that weekend. Distributor Toho announced that as of August 5, 2010, the film managed to gross more than 3.5 billion yen and attracted more than 3.7 million viewers. According to the Motion Picture Producers Association of Japan, Arrietty is the top-grossing Japanese film in their box office for the year for 2010; it grossed approximately 9.25 billion yen ($110.0 million).

In France, the film was well received by the public. More than 100,000 people watched the film on its debut week in France, allowing the film to gross more than US$1.4 million that week. Overall, ticket sales for Arrietty, le petit monde des chapardeurs in France totaled almost 740,000 between its release on January 12, 2011, and March 1, 2011. In the United Kingdom, the film generated £76,000 ($120,232) in its first weekend.

In North America, Arrietty opened on 1,522 theaters, a record for a Studio Ghibli film. The film opened in ninth place with $6.45 million during the three-day President's Day weekend and went on to earn $8.68 million during the four-day weekend, behind the 3D release of Star Wars: Episode I – The Phantom Menace. This was the largest opening ever for a Studio Ghibli film (beating Ponyos $3.6 million). The film also scored the best weekend per-theater average in North America for the studio ($4,235 against Ponyos $3,868). Arrietty closed in theaters on June 8, 2012 with $19 million. In total earnings, its highest-grossing countries outside Japan and North America were France ($7.01 million), South Korea ($6.86 million) and Hong Kong ($1.75 million).

Critical reception

On review aggregator Rotten Tomatoes, the film holds an approval rating of 94% based on 153 reviews, with an average rating of 7.7/10. The website's critics consensus reads, "Visually lush, refreshingly free of family-friendly clatter, and anchored with soulful depth, The Secret World of Arrietty lives up to Studio Ghibli's reputation." On Metacritic, the film has a weighted average score of 80 out of 100, based on 56 critics, indicating "generally favorable reviews."

Cristoph Mark of The Daily Yomiuri praised the film, calling it "likely a perennial favorite among children". He particularly liked the film effects, which he described as "Drops of water loom large and drip like syrup; the ticking of a clock reverberates through the floor and the theater's speakers; tissue paper is large and stiff...", adding that these effects gives the audience "a glimpse into their own world, but from a different perspective". Mark Schilling of The Japan Times gave the film a rating of four out of five stars, and said that the film "speaks straight to the heart and imagination of [everyone]." Schilling also praised the film's animation, saying that [Studio Ghibli animators] are past masters at creating the illusion of presence and depth without [3-D effects]. However, he also said that in some scenes the film "threatens to devolve into the sappy, the preachy, and the slapsticky" but noted that these scenes were "mercifully brief".

Steve Rose, the reviewer for The Guardian, gave the film four out of five stars, describing it as "a gentle and entrancing tale, deeper and richer than more instantly gratifying fare." Rose also described the film as "the soul food of the animation world," however, he did note that this film "doesn't match previous hits such as Spirited Away or Princess Mononoke in terms of epic scale or adult appeal", even though it bears many of their hallmarks: bright, detailed animation. Deborah Young of The Hollywood Reporter gave a positive review of the film. She said that the film "remains essentially a film for children". Young later went on to say that the relationship with Sho and Arrietty "touches the heartstrings with gentle yearning", and praised Yonebayashi for its direction. In the opening remarks made by David Gritten of The Telegraph, he said that the film was "ravishingly colourful and textured". He also praised the animation, saying that "animation doesn’t get better than Arrietty." Gritten gave the film a rating of 4 stars out of 5 stars. In his review for Special Broadcasting Service, Don Groves gave a mixed review of the film and said that Arrietty was a "very slender, minor work." Groves also criticized the film's storyline, calling it "a gentle, humourless, uncomplicated tale of friendship in an alien environment." However, he praised the voice acting as "generally is as professional as [one would] expect." Groves gave the film a rating of 3.5 stars out of 5 stars.

Zac Bertschy of Anime News Network gave the North American version of Arrietty an overall grade of "B". Bertschy praised the voice acting in the film and also praised the intricate details of the film's backgrounds, but said that "there isn't more going on here, even when it comes to the film's basic story", however, he later went on to say that it is "foolish to deny the simple, warm, and familiar pleasures of Arrietty's world". Leslie Felperin of Variety praised the film as "old school, mostly in a good way." She also praised the film for its animation, as well as Yonebayashi's direction. Felperin noted however, that the film lacked its "approach to storytelling that made Studio Ghibli's other [films] so compelling." Manohla Dargis of The New York Times praised the film for its hand-drawn animation and Yonebayashi's direction. Dargis later went on to say that the film has "a way of taking [the audience] where [they] may not expect." Kenneth Turan of the Los Angeles Times described the film as "beautiful, gentle and pure". Turan also praised the detail and animation in the film, as well as its storyline. He also praised Karey Kirkpatrick and Gary Rydstrom for their adaptation of the film, as well as their casting decisions for the British and North American versions. Lisa Schwarzbaum, the reviewer for Entertainment Weekly, gave the film a "B+" and praised Arrietty for its animation. Schwarzbaum later went on to say that the result is a "dreamy, soft-edge hybrid, equally interested in observing raindrops and the worries of a race of minuscule beings."

Accolades

Merchandise

Comics
Arrietty was adapted into a Japanese manga series. The adaptation was first published by Tokuma Shoten Publishing Co., Ltd. within Japan, and was released in four separate volumes. Viz Media released the English version of the manga within North America in January 2012.

Volume list

See also
 Epic
 FernGully: The Last Rainforest
 Watership Down

References

External links

 Official website 
(IT) Arrietty e l'inestimabile Nemico che colpisce Quando Esci di Casa. on the Italian Comic website uBC - magazine.ubcfumetti.com
 
 
 
 
 
 

2010 anime films
Anime films based on novels
2010s children's animated films
2010s children's fantasy films
2010s Japanese-language films
2010 directorial debut films
2010 films
Films based on British novels
Films based on fantasy novels
Films directed by Hiromasa Yonebayashi
Films set in Japan
Nippon TV films
Films with screenplays by Hayao Miyazaki
Japan Academy Prize for Animation of the Year winners
Japanese animated fantasy films
Studio Ghibli animated films
Toho animated films
The Borrowers
CJ Entertainment films